Never Not Funny is a podcast hosted by American comedian Jimmy Pardo, since spring 2006, currently releasing two episodes a week. He and producer/co-host Matt Belknap have appeared in every episode. Comedian Mike Schmidt appeared as co-host for season one, except for the final episode of the season, when his departure was announced.

The show moved to a pay format in March 2008, with the first twenty minutes of each show remaining available to non-paying subscribers. It subsequently returned to partial free distribution when it joined the Earwolf network in January 2014, with a premium subscription available for access to video and weekly bonus episodes. In late 2019, the show became fully independent again, hosted by ART19, later under the umbrella of their Misfit Toys Podcast Co-Op curated by Jimmy Pardo and Matt Belknap. The main weekly audio episode remains free, while video, additional weekly episodes, bonus content and full archives going back to 2006 are available to various tiers of Platinum subscribers.

History 
Never Not Funny began when Matt Belknap interviewed Pardo on the podcast for his popular alternative comedy forum A Special Thing. The two had previously discussed producing a podcast version of Jimmy's Los Angeles show "Running Your Trap," which he hosted at the Upright Citizens Brigade Theatre, but they hit it off so well on AST Radio that Pardo said "This is the show."

The first episode featured Pardo, Belknap, and guest Mike Schmidt. Pat Francis was scheduled for episode 2, but when he was unavailable, Schmidt (usually referred to by Pardo as "The Former Third Baseman" after the similarly named baseball player) became the permanent co-host. This arrangement continued for the first season. Every fourth episode would feature a guest such as Pat Francis, Scott Aukerman or Graham Elwood. Midway through the first season, the theme song was changed from a brief portion of an unnamed instrumental song by Jimmy's close friend Daver to "Mad At The World" by Daver, with sound bites from previous episodes mixed into the song. This three-man setup lasted for sixty episodes, including a clip show and two live shows recorded at the UCB Theatre. The show went through little change throughout the first season until episode sixty, when Jimmy announced that his relationship with Mike Schmidt had become strained through the years and that they had decided to go their separate ways; Schmidt left the show in an attempt to reconcile their friendship. Mike explained the situation on May 25, 2007, on his website. In March 2008, Mike started his own solo podcast named The 40 Year Old Boy. At the end of season six, Schmidt made his first return to the podcast, this time as a guest, when Pardo decided, "Life's too short.", and has been a frequent guest ever since.

Following Schmidt's departure, the show began its second season. Instead of the former three-man lineup, Pardo and Belknap appeared as the only regulars, along with a rotating guest every episode. On episode 1325, it was announced that at the beginning of season 14, Never Not Funny would change to a free show in audio format. Plus, Never Not Funny would also join the Earwolf podcast network, co-owned by Scott Aukerman (who was the guest on the episode and the only guest to appear in every season). Full audio would be available on Earwolf, iTunes and NNF's feed, while video of the episodes were part of the new "Players Club" package for Primo subscribers with 25 episodes per six-month season. Subscribers of the Players Club would also get an additional weekly lettered episode (A to Z), plus bonus material such as live shows.

In late 2019, the show left Earwolf to return to full independent status. Following a special 1000th episode on February 26, 2020, they launched a new Platinum monthly subscription service for the 26th season, continuing the free audio feed for the weekly numbered episode on Wednesday, with all Platinum subscribers getting both audio and video for the numbered episodes, weekly lettered episodes on Sunday and bonus episodes. Additional content was offered for higher subscription tiers, including full audio and video archives going back to the beginning (audio only for the first two seasons), occasional live stream shows and exclusive merchandise.

During the COVID-19 pandemic the show underwent some changes starting in March 2020, with shows being done remotely with video conferencing rather than in studio (with occasional shows done in the studio parking lot to allow for proper social distancing). A third weekly show was also added for subscribers on Friday, labelled the Isolation Files, which features the cast playing games, frequently run by fans of the show. They returned to in-studio shows in June 2021.

In September 2020 Jimmy Pardo and Matt Belknap founded the Misfit Toys Podcast Co-Op through ART19, where they serve as curators for independent comedy podcasts hosted by the company, including Never Not Funny and podcasts hosted by various friends of the show, including Todd Glass, Jen Kirkman, Doug Benson and former NNF co-host Mike Schmidt.

Show Format 
The show is of the comedy talk variety, consisting of free-form conversation between Jimmy Pardo, Matt Belknap and a guest, usually from the comedy or music field. The top of the show currently consists of the show regulars (currently including video producer Eliot Hochberg and "intern" Garon Cockrell) and then bringing the guest into the mix after a half-hour. Topics discussed range from music and popular culture to personal lives and amusing or interesting anecdotes.

Pardo will also frequently slip into one of his many characters, including Cajun Jimmy, Plantation Jimmy, Dirty Carson, Actor Auditioning for a Blind Role, Stallone in a Bottle, Mad Dog Russo, Dice's Lady and Old Man Lizard.

Various recurring bits and games have developed on the show over the years, including "Stupid Question of the Week", "Judge Jimmy", "The Letter Game", "Sevens", "Oliver's Trivia", "Celebrity Sightings", "The Mail Is Here", "Doc Talk (Documentaries)" and "Doc Talk (Doctors)". Most of these are accompanied by theme songs created by friends and fans of the show.

Until the end of the third season, the show was recorded in a single take without any editing. After the 2008 Chino Hills earthquake forced the show to stop briefly (originally so Jimmy, Matt and guest Patton Oswalt could check on family members) the podcast has had one or more small break per episode, during which Matt plugs projects and social media accounts of the hosts and guests.

History 
Never Not Funny began when Matt Belknap interviewed Pardo on the podcast for his popular alternative comedy forum A Special Thing. The two had previously discussed producing a podcast version of Jimmy's Los Angeles show "Running Your Trap," which he hosted at the Upright Citizens Brigade Theatre, but they hit it off so well on AST Radio that Pardo said "This is the show."

The first episode featured Pardo, Belknap, and guest Mike Schmidt. Pat Francis was scheduled for episode 2, but when he was unavailable, Schmidt (usually referred to by Pardo as "The Former Third Baseman" after the similarly named baseball player) became the permanent co-host. This arrangement continued for the first season. Every fourth episode would feature a guest such as Pat Francis, Scott Aukerman or Graham Elwood. Midway through the first season, the theme song was changed from a brief portion of an unnamed instrumental song by Jimmy's close friend Daver to "Mad At The World" by Daver, with sound bites from previous episodes mixed into the song. This three-man setup lasted for sixty episodes, including a clip show and two live shows recorded at the UCB Theatre. The show went through little change throughout the first season until episode sixty, when Jimmy announced that his relationship with Mike Schmidt had become strained through the years and that they had decided to go their separate ways; Schmidt left the show in an attempt to reconcile their friendship. Mike explained the situation on May 25, 2007, on his website. In March 2008, Mike started his own solo podcast named The 40 Year Old Boy. At the end of season six, Schmidt made his first return to the podcast, this time as a guest, when Pardo decided, "Life's too short.", and has been a frequent guest ever since.

Following Schmidt's departure, the show began its second season. Instead of the former three-man lineup, Pardo and Belknap appeared as the only regulars, along with a rotating guest every episode. Pat Francis was the guest for the first episode of the second season, which began the tradition of Francis being the "third chair" and appearing on every fourth episode. It was in the second season that the show received its first sponsorship, lasting only a few weeks. On episode 39 of the second season, it was announced that the show would move to a pay format beginning with season three. Listeners would have to pay to continue receiving the complete podcast, although the first twenty minutes of each episode would still be available for free. The subscription price was set to $19.99 for 26 episodes. They also hired Pardo's brother-in-law Andrew Koenig to record video of the show. Only 5 minute clips of the show were available on video during season three, which were hosted on Koenig's site Monkey Go Lucky, but beginning with season four, full video of the show became available for $24.99 (full video for season three was released retroactively several years later).

Midway through season six tragedy struck when Andrew Koenig died. An episode was released in remembrance, highlighting some of Koenig's best moments throughout his time on the show. Andrew's close friend Eliot Hochberg, who had been providing the video equipment, assumed his role as videographer. Shortly afterwards they hired an intern, Dan Katz, aka "Tabasco Ears", to look up material on the internet and take notes. Katz left the show at the beginning of season 11 and was replaced by Pop Culture Beast editor Garon Cockrell, aka "The Beast," shortly after.

On episode 1325, it was announced that at the beginning of season 14, Never Not Funny would change to a free show in audio format. Plus, Never Not Funny would also join the Earwolf podcast network, co-owned by Scott Aukerman (who was the guest on the episode and the only guest to appear in every season). Full audio would be available on Earwolf, iTunes and NNF's feed, while video of the episodes were part of the new "Players Club" package for Primo subscribers with 25 episodes per six-month season. Subscribers of the Players Club would also get an additional weekly lettered episode (A to Z), plus bonus material such as live shows.

In late 2019, the show left Earwolf to return to full independent status. Following a special 1000th episode on February 26, 2020, they launched a new Platinum monthly subscription service for the 26th season, continuing the free audio feed for the weekly numbered episode on Wednesday, with all Platinum subscribers getting both audio and video for the numbered episodes, weekly lettered episodes on Sunday and bonus episodes. Additional content was offered for higher subscription tiers, including full audio and video archives going back to the beginning (audio only for the first two seasons), occasional live stream shows and exclusive merchandise.

During the COVID-19 pandemic the show underwent some changes starting in March 2020, with shows being done remotely with video conferencing rather than in studio (with occasional shows done in the studio parking lot to allow for proper social distancing). A third weekly show was also added for subscribers on Friday, labelled the Isolation Files, which features the cast playing games, frequently run by fans of the show.

In September 2020 Jimmy Pardo and Matt Belknap founded the Misfit Toys Podcast Co-Op through ART19, where they serve as curators for independent comedy podcasts hosted by the company, including Never Not Funny and podcasts hosted by various friends of the show, including Todd Glass, Jen Kirkman, Doug Benson and former NNF co-host Mike Schmidt.

Spin-off shows have included Jimmy′s Records and Tapes, a video-only show featuring Pardo talking about music, and Playing Games With Jimmy Pardo, an audio-only game show with listeners calling in to play a variety of games with Pardo, Belknap and a celebrity guest.

Pardcast-A-Thon
A mini episode was released at the beginning of season six that announced Never Not Funny would be doing a live, streaming podcast on their website to raise money in benefit of Smile Train. The first annual Pardcast-A-Thon took place on Black Friday 2009. Pardo, Belknap and Pat Francis welcomed guests such as Maria Bamford, Jon Hamm, Rich Sommer and Oscar Nunez. By the end of the night, they raised over $12,000.

The next year at Pardcast-A-Thon 2010, they changed the venue to the Acme Comedy Theater and went 12 hours instead of 9 to give even more of a telethon vibe (and raise more money). At the end of the night at 6 am, they raised $27,000. Guests included Rob Corddry, Sarah Silverman, Aimee Mann and Andy Richter.

For Pardcast-A-Thon 2011, the set up was the same as the previous year. Guests included Amy Poehler, Lisa Loeb, Walter Koenig and Adam Carolla. By the end of the event, the amount of money raised was almost double the previous year's total with $41,000.

Pardcast-A-Thon 2012 was expected to the biggest to date with a goal of $50,000 by the end of the night. The hours were changed to 12 pm to 12 am PST so people on the East Coast could stay up later and donate more. Guests included Bob Saget, Conan O'Brien, Simon Helberg, Kevin Nealon, Colin Hay and Zach Galifianakis. The goal of $50,000 was not only raised after 13.5 hours, but midway through an anonymous donor said they would match the end total, making the grand total over $100,000.

The 5th Annual Pardcast-A-Thon went by with flying colors with the guys raising over $130,000 (half of that thanks to the anonymous donor again) by the end of the night. Wayne Federman sat in for the whole event playing music on keyboard. Guests included Patton Oswalt, Jack Wagner, Phil Hendrie, Janet Varney, Bob Odenkirk and Matt Walsh.

Pardcast-A-Thon 2014 was just as successful as the previous year, if not more. With Federman as the house band again, Jimmy and the gang raised a record $156,000 over the night. Guests included Weird Al Yankovic, Jack McBrayer, Paul Dooley, Fred Willard, Billy Eichner, Patton Oswalt, Sarah Silverman and more.

Pardo and Belknap stated in a Season 16 episode that The 7th Annual Pardcast-A-Thon will not take place on Black Friday 2015, due to many scheduling conflicts in the past. The 7th annual Pardcast-A-Thon took place on March 5, 2016. The event raised over $169,000. Guests included Rob Corddry, Timothy Omundson, Mike McShane, Conan O'Brien, Tommy Shaw, Jon Hamm and more with Wayne Federman on piano.

For Pardcast-A-Thon 2017, the venue changed to Flapper's Comedy Club after the podcast had a successful residency there. On March 4, with Federman on keys, Jimmy and the gang raised over $140,000. Guests included Jon Cryer, Rachel Bloom, Randall Park, Richard Kind, Angela Kinsey, Kumail Nanjiani, Mindy Sterling and more.

Pardcast-A-Thon returned to Flapper's on March 3, 2018. Guests included Kevin Nealon, Rory O'Malley, Cristela Alonzo, Scott Aukerman and more. Over $200,000 was raised, and the lifetime total crossed the $1 million mark.

On May 4, 2019, the tenth Pardcast-A-Thon took place at Flappers, with the cast joined by guests including D'Arcy Carden, Ahmed Bestand, Paula Poundstone.

Due to the COVID-19 pandemic the 2020 Pardcast-A-Thon was delayed from a scheduled May date until October 10, 2020, and was a 6-hour live virtual event rather than a live stage show. Guests include Jason Benetti, Catie Lazarus, Ellis Paul, Rebecca Loebe and Jen Kirkman. Over $160,000 was raised.

Over the course of 11 Pardcast-A-Thons they have raised over $1.3 million for Smile Train.

Awards
Never Not Funny was the winner a 2008 Rooftop Comedy Award for best Comedy podcast.
Never Not Funny was nominated for a 2007 Podcast Award in the Comedy category.
Never Not Funny was nominated for a 2006 Weblog Award.
Never Not Funny was made one of iTunes' "Best in 2006" and "Best in 2007" podcasts.

Guests/Episodes
Guests pulled from NeverNotFunny.com.

The Gang Episodes
Episodes that feature no guest and are generally more loose natured.

Pulled from NeverNotFunny.com.

References

How The Once Struggling Podcast 'Never Not Funny' Raised A Million Dollars For Charity, LAIst.com
Talking Pardcast-a-thon with Jimmy Pardo, Paste.com.

External links
Official site

Audio podcasts
Comedy and humor podcasts
2006 podcast debuts